Kindersley Regional Airport  is located  north of Kindersley, Saskatchewan, Canada.

See also 
List of airports in Saskatchewan

References

External links

Registered aerodromes in Saskatchewan
Kindersley No. 290, Saskatchewan